Philip Clarence Cooney (September 14, 1882 – October 6, 1957) was a Major League Baseball player. He was a third baseman for the New York Highlanders for one game in the 1905 season. Cooney  had no hits in three at-bats.

On June 17, 1917, he was the first Western League player to have an unassisted triple play.

He was born and died in New York, New York, and was Jewish.

References

External links
Baseball-Reference.com page
Baseball-Almanac

New York Yankees players
1882 births
1957 deaths
Baseball players from New York (state)
Paterson Intruders players
Johnstown Johnnies players
Portland Beavers players
Portland Colts players
Spokane Indians players
Sioux City Packers players
Sioux City Indians players
Omaha Rourkes players
Jersey City Skeeters players
Jewish American baseball players
Jewish Major League Baseball players
Burials at Long Island National Cemetery
Paterson Invaders players